Abdülaziz Demircan (born 5 February 1991) is a Turkish footballer of Kurdish descent who plays as a goalkeeper for Tarsus İdman Yurdu.

Club career
Born in Diyarbakır, Turkey, the goalkeeper played for Diyarbakır BB, Karabükspor, Kayserispor, Konyaspor, Dalkurd, Osmanlıspor, and Amed S.K.

International career
Demircan made his debut for a Turkish A2-side also known as Turkey B under head coach Fatih Terim on October 14, 2014. The opponent was England C. He had a clean sheet, while Turkey B won the friendly with a 2-0 score.

Forced leave of Dalkurd FF
Despite the announcement of club press officer Cihan Dalaba in May 2018 that Demircan's private Instagram account was hacked, the goalkeeper was released in June 2018 by Swedish side Dalkurd FF. Demircan sharing a picture on Instagram Story with the Turkish flag, Atatürk and the figures 1919 which also referred to the beginning of the Turkish War of Independence of 1919, created great anger among Dalkurd FF-supporters. Ultimately, this forced Demircan to leave the club, according to Director of Football Adil Kizil.

Demircan later stated that he was sent to the bench after the sharing on Instagram because of the fear of attacks of club fans. He also got harassed and teammates insulted him and would not talk to him afterwards. Fearing repercussions the statements about a hacking were communicated by the club, told Demircan.

References

External links

1991 births
Sportspeople from Diyarbakır
Living people
Turkish footballers
Turkey B international footballers
Association football goalkeepers
Kardemir Karabükspor footballers
Kayserispor footballers
Konyaspor footballers
Dalkurd FF players
Ankaraspor footballers
1461 Trabzon footballers
Tarsus Idman Yurdu footballers
Süper Lig players
Allsvenskan players
TFF First League players
TFF Second League players
TFF Third League players
Turkish expatriate footballers
Expatriate footballers in Sweden
Turkish expatriate sportspeople in Sweden